Chargemaster Limited (branded as bp pulse, formerly BP Chargemaster, chargemaster, POLAR and Polar Plus) is a supplier of charging infrastructure for electric vehicles, based in Milton Keynes, England. It provides charging units for home, business and public use, and operates its own electric vehicle public charging network, which is the largest network in the United Kingdom.

Chargemaster is the only company to manufacture electric vehicle rapid chargers in the UK. , the company had supplied more than 30,000 charging points for electric vehicle drivers' homes and more than 10,000 public and commercially-operated charging points.

The company was founded in 2008 by entrepreneur David Martell. In June 2018, BP announced that it had entered into an agreement to buy Chargemaster for £130m, with the company to be rebranded BP Chargemaster. Further rebranding to 'bp pulse' took place in December 2020.

History
Chargemaster was founded in Luton in 2008 by David Martell, the founder and former CEO of Trafficmaster. Shareholders included the venture capital arm of BMW, BMW i Ventures, and technology company Qualcomm. 

The company launched its POLAR network of public charging points in 2011. By 2017, the network had over 5,000 public charging points, just under 40% of the total of more than 13,000 charging points in the UK.

In 2012, Chargemaster announced its involvement in a trial of wireless charging for electric vehicles in London, in partnership with Qualcomm. Growth capital, initially £3 million, was invested by Beringea in 2014.

Chargemaster launched its POLAR Plus subscription scheme in 2015, allowing members to pay a monthly fee for access to its public charging network, with points earned each time a member uses a public charging point, which could be traded for a week-long experience in one of a fleet of electric vehicles operated by Chargemaster, including a BMW i8 and a Tesla Model S.

Chargemaster acquired Hereford-based GB Electrical, a national electrical contractor specialising in the installation of electric vehicle charging points, in 2015. The business had been working with Chargemaster since 2013 and is an authorised installer of charging points installed under both the Electric Vehicle Homecharge Scheme and the Workplace Charging Scheme, administered by the Office for Low Emission Vehicles. Following the acquisition, Chargemaster announced a £15 million investment in its charging network to create 2,000 new charging points, which would include new ways to access the points, including contactless payments, alongside existing access methods of RFID cards and smartphone apps.

In 2017, the company acquired the electric vehicle charging point supplier Elektromotive, including its charging network management subsidiary, Charge Your Car, to form the UK's largest electric vehicle infrastructure provider.

After being acquired by BP in 2018, the company's legal name changed from Chargemaster plc to Chargemaster Limited. Martell retained a board position until June 2019. Later that year, the company moved from Luton to newly built headquarters in the Linford Wood area of Milton Keynes. In December 2020, the POLAR and Chargemaster brands were replaced by 'bp pulse'.

Chargemaster has been listed in the Sunday Times Tech Track 100 list of top performing British companies since 2014.

Products

Charging units
Chargemaster supplies wall-mounted charging points and floor-standing charging posts with AC power ratings of 3.6 kW, 7.2 kW and 22 kW, and floor-standing rapid chargers, with power ratings of 43kw AC and 50kw DC. The 3.6 kW and 7.2 kW charging units require a minimum single-phase electricity supply. The 22 kW and rapid charging units require a three-phase electricity supply.

Chargemaster launched a new rapid charger in 2015, which is produced in its Milton Keynes factory. The Chargemaster 'Ultracharge' unit features a 50 kW-rated CHAdeMO connector, a 43kw-rated AC Type 2 connector and a 50 kW-rated CCS connector.

Chargemaster installed their first 150kW rapid charger in 2019; these chargers are supplied by ABB and feature both CHAdeMO and CCS connectors. Chargemaster aims to have 400 of these chargers at BP forecourts.

Home charging
Chargemaster has partnerships to provide home charging units for owners of electric vehicles made by several manufacturers, including BMW, Kia, Mercedes-Benz, Mitsubishi, Nissan, Renault, and Toyota.

The company is also the home charging partner for The London Taxi Company and provides charging units for drivers of its TX eCity plug-in hybrid taxi.

The company's home charging units are approved by the UK government's Office for Zero Emission Vehicles and are eligible for the government’s Electric Vehicle Homecharge Scheme, which provides funding of up to 75% (capped at £350) towards the cost of installing electric vehicle charge points at domestic properties across the UK.

Workplace charging
Chargemaster supplies charge points to workplaces, including supermarkets, local authorities and other businesses.

The company's workplace charging units are approved by the UK government’s Office for Zero Emission Vehicles and are eligible for the government's Workplace Charging Scheme, which subsidises the cost of the purchase and installation of electric vehicle charge points, for eligible businesses, charities and public sector organisations.

Public sector charging
Chargemaster has installed over 600 charge points for more than 50 local authorities.

In 2016, Chargemaster was awarded a £2.3 million contract to provide additional charging points in Milton Keynes, including for two new petrol-station-style rapid charging hubs.

In 2017, Chargemaster was awarded a contract to supply its Ultracharge rapid charger under a Transport for London contract to provide public rapid charging points for The London Taxi Company's forthcoming TX eCity plug-in hybrid taxi. The £18 million Transport for London project aimed to create a network of 300 rapid charging points in London by 2020.

Brands

Pulse public charging network
The company operates 'bp pulse', the largest electric vehicle charging network in the UK, operating more than 5,000 public charge points. The network is accessible via either a pay-as-you-go 'instant access' scheme or a monthly subscription scheme, with charging points accessed via an RFID card or fob. Prior to December 2020, the schemes were marketed as 'POLAR Instant' and 'POLAR Plus' respectively.

Owners of BMW i models can access the network through membership of the BMW i ChargeNow service.

Charge Your Car 
The Charge Your Car subsidiary provides "back office" services to charge point owners, in many cases local authorities. CYC handles user registration and billing, and provides a map of charge points, but does not own or maintain the equipment.

Electric Vehicle Experience Centre 
In 2017, Chargemaster won the contract from Milton Keynes Council to operate the UK’s first multi-brand electric car showroom, the Electric Vehicle Experience Centre, as part of the UK government’s Go Ultra Low Cities programme.

Partnerships
Chargemaster has partnerships with car manufacturers, hotels, supermarkets and motor industry organisations, including: The AA, Q Park, Waitrose, and Accor for its Novotel and Ibis hotel brands.

Chargemaster installed 78 charge points for the London Fire Brigade, the majority of which are accessible by its staff, but nine of which (at Croydon, East Ham, Edmonton, Finchley, Hainault, Harold Hill, Hornsey, Ilford and New Malden fire stations) are publicly accessible.

The company is the official supplier of charging infrastructure to the FIA Formula E electric motor racing series. Chargemaster facilitates wireless charging of the official course cars, including the BMW i8 safety car and the BMW i3 medical car.

References

External links 

Charging stations
British companies established in 2008
Companies based in Milton Keynes
2018 mergers and acquisitions
BP subsidiaries
Electric vehicle infrastructure developers